Kuwait is divided into six governorates, and in each there are several areas.

Areas are much less commonly called by other names such as districts or towns. However they are commonly known inside the English-speaking community in Kuwait as and are officially translated to areas. The Arabic word for area, Mintaqah منطقة can mean both mean area and region. Areas are further subdivided into blocks, each of which is refereed by to a number. All blocks are divided into streets شوارع (singular شارع šāriʿ). However, some areas may be further subdivided into جادات Jaddāt (singular جادة Jadda), which might be translated to avenue or lane.

Each area in Kuwait has an official governmental facility called co-op society or just society. For example, in Surra, it's called Surra Co-op Society. Societies are mainly supermarkets that provide foods and produces, and they may take part in maintaining some on the areas' landmarks like parks and schools, but they're not legally obliged to. Societies have elected members who manage them. Only residents of the area can vote for their society membership.

Capital Governorate

The Capital Governorate comprises the core areas of Kuwait City and several offshore islands, among them Failaka Island.

Hawalli Governorate

Mubarak Al-Kabeer Governorate
The Mubarak Al-Kabeer governorate is the governorate most recently established. It is named after Mubarak the Great.

Ahmadi Governorate

Farwaniya Governorate

Jahra Governorate

See also 
Electoral districts of Kuwait

References

 
Subdivisions of Kuwait
Kuwait 2
Kuwait 2
Kuwait geography-related lists